The 1901 Army Cadets football team represented the United States Military Academy in the 1901 college football season. In their first and only season under head coach Leon Kromer, the Cadets compiled a 5–1–2 record, shut out four opponents, and outscored all opponents by a combined total of 98 to 22.  The team's only loss was by a 6 to 0 score against an undefeated Harvard team that has been recognized as a co-national champion for the 1901 season.  The Cadets also tied with Yale (5–5) and Princeton (6–6). In the annual Army–Navy Game, the Cadets defeated the Midshipmen by an 11 to 5 score.

Two members of the 1901 Army team have been inducted into the College Football Hall of Fame: quarterback Charles Dudley Daly and tackle Paul Bunker.  Both are also recognized by the NCAA as consensus first-team players on the 1901 College Football All-America Team.  Daly received first-team honors from Walter Camp, Caspar Whitney, the New York Post and The Philadelphia Inquirer. Bunker received first-team honors from Camp and the New York Post and second-team honors from Whitney.

President Theodore Roosevelt attended the Army–Navy Game in Philadelphia on December 1. A newspaper account noted: "For the first time in the history of foot-ball a President of the United States added dignity to a noted contest by his presence."

Schedule

References

Army
Army Black Knights football seasons
Army Cadets football